The Vogelkop owlet-nightjar (Aegotheles affinis) or allied owlet-nightjar, is a species of bird in the family Aegothelidae. It can be found in New Guinea. It is known from Bird's Head Peninsula and Eastern Highlands Province.

References

Vogelkop owlet-nightjar
Birds of the Doberai Peninsula
Birds of Papua New Guinea
Birds of prey of New Guinea
Vogelkop owlet-nightjar